The following is a list of terrorist incidents involving railway systems:

Before 1960

1960s

1970s

1980s

1990s

2000s

2010s

2020s

Failed attacks
 Najibullah Zazi was arrested before attempting to bomb stations of the New York City Subway in 2009.
 Farooque Ahmed plotted to bomb Washington Metro stations in 2010.

References 

Railway